The House of Lannoy is the name of an old and important Belgian noble family that takes its name from the town of Lannoy in northern France. The name comes from l'Annoy (or l'Annoit,  from Latin alnetum), which means 'the alderwood' in Picard French of Flanders.

History
The oldest known ancestor is Gillion de l'Annoit, who lived in the 13th century. Many of his descendants were members of the Order of the Golden Fleece. They played a prominent role in Flanders during the Middle Ages. Different family branches and lines existed amongst the Lords of Beaurepaire, Clervaux, Princes of Sulmona and Princes of Rheina-Wolbeck.

One branch of the family supposedly became the influential American Delano family through its progenitor, Philip Delano. However, the possible connection between the two has never been proven. A branch of the family supposedly engaged in the transatlantic slave trade, resulting in an existing lineage of the family in South America and the Caribbean.

Notable members

Lords of Molembaix

Guillebert I de Lannoy, Lord of Santes;Married to Catherine de Saint-Aubin, Lady of Molembais:
Guillebert II  de Lannoy (1386–1462), Flemish traveler and diplomat
Hugo van Lannoy (1384–1456), Flemish traveler and diplomat
Baudouin de Lannoy, said "Le Begue", Lord of Molembais (1388–1474): Flemish diplomat
Baudouin II de Lannoy, Lord of Molembais: Knight Of the Golden Fleece;married to Marie d'Esne, Lady of Conroy.
Philippe I de Lannoy, Lord of Molembais; Grand Huntsman of BrabantMarried to Madeleine of Bourgundy.
Jean de Lannoy, Lord of Molembais: Knight of the Golden Fleece;Married to Joanne de Ligne.
Marie de Lannoy;Married to John IV of Glymes(1528–1567): Marquess of Berges
Baudouin III de Lannoy, Lord of Turcoing; Lord of the Golden Fleece.
Philippe II, Lord of Beauvoir;married to Jeanne of Blois.
Françoise de Lannoy; married to Antoine of Montmorency
Madeleine de Lannoy; married to Jean de Roisin.
Jacqueline de Lannoy;married to Claude Bouton, Lord of Corbaron.
Jean I de Lannoy, Lord of La Motterie;Married to Marie de Cordes
Jean II de Lannoy, Lord of La Motterie

Lords of Leeuwergem and La Motterie 
Leeuwergem is a small village in Flanders, it has an 18th century castle. The first small castle in Leeuwergem was built by Valentin de Lannoy in the 17th century. The branch of the Lords of Leeuwergem became extinct after 3 generations.  The branch of the Counts of la Motterie was known to have multiple men in military service of the Crown.

Jacques de Lannoy, Lord of la Motterie, died 1587:Married to Susanne of Noyelles.
Adrien de Lannoy, Lord of Wasmes: founder of the branch of Lannoy de Wasmes.
Claude de Lannoy, 1st Count of la Motterie, Knight of the Golden Fleece;married to Claudine d'Eltz, Lady of Clairvaux.
Philippe de Lannoy, 2nd Count of la Motterie;married to Louise-Michele d'Ognyes.
Ignace-Philippe de Lannoy, 3rd Count of Beaurepiare; see further.
François-Hyacinthe de Lannoy, 4th Count of la Motterie;married to Anne-Françoise of Gavre.
Marie-Thérèse de Lannoy, Lady of the Starry Cross;married to Josef-Dominik, Count of Konigsegg-Rothenfels.
Eugène-Hyacinthe de Lannoy, 5th Count of la Motterie; Lord Grand Marshall in Imperial Service; Knight of the Golden Fleece and Councillor of State.
Chrétien de Lannoy, 6th Count of la Motterie; Imperial Lord Chamberlain. He died without male heirs and was the last Count of La Motterie. 
Albert-Eugene de Lannoy, 1st Baron of Clairvaux; founder of the Branch of de Lannoy-Clairvaux.
Valentin de Lannoy, died 1640: Governor of Hulst.married in 1622 to Isabelle de La Loo, Lady of Leeuwergem
Eugene de Lannoy, Lord of Leeuwergem.
Charles de Lannoy, Lord of Leeuwergem.
Albert de Lannoy, Lord of Leeuwergem, died 1688:married to Adrienne-Marie vanden Eeckhoutte.
Adrienne-Florence de Lannoy:married to Charles de Boisschot, 3nd Baron of Saventhem. 
Hélène de Lannoy, Noble Canonnese in Nivelles.
Anne-Marguerite de Lannoy:Married to François de Boisschot, 2nd Baron of Saventhem, son of Ferdinand de Boisschot
Jean-Louis de Lannoy, Lord of Leeuwergem.

Counts of Beaurepaire 

The county of Beaurepaire in Avesnes was inherited by descendants of Louise-Michèle d'Oignies: her father Maximilien d'Oignies was the first Count of Beaurepaire. His youngest grandson Ignace-Philippe became the 3rd Count of Beaurepaire.

Ignace I Philippe de Lannoy, 3rd Count of Beaurepiare, (1650-1715):married to Marie-Françoise de Coloma, Lady of Bornhem
François-Joseph-Louis de Lannoy, 4th Count of Beaurepaire;Married to Marguerite Madeleine de Clermont-Tonnere.
Charles-François-Ignace de Lannoy, 5th Count of Beaurepaire, (1686-1752): Knight of St Lazare in 1717;Married to Alix-Barbe de St-Vaast.
Ignace II Godefroi de Lannoy, 6th Count of Beaurepaire, (1723-1794):Military Knight of Saint-Louis: Executed by Guillotine in France. 
Claude-François de Lannoy
Adrien-François-Joseph de Lannoy, Knight of St Lazarus.
Aldegonde Eleonore de Lannoy; Lady of Bornem:married to Baudry Adelbert, Count de Marnix, Baron of Rollecourt; Heirs of Bornem Castle.
Claude-François de Marnix, Baron of Rollencourt.

Lords of Clairvaux 
Albert-Eugène inherited the rights and Dominium of Clairvaux, after the death of his parents. He was created for his merit as imperial ambassador 1st Baron of Clairvaux. A Cadet branch inherited the title of Prince of Rheina-Wolbecq.

Albert-Eugène de Lannoy, 1st Baron of Clairvaux;married to Anne Margarethe de Reede.
Andrien I Gérard de Lannoy, 2nd Baron of Clairvaux
François-Ferdinand, Count of Lannoy
Adrien II Damien-Gérard-Ernest de Lannoy, 1st Count of Clairvaux; Count of the Empire.
Adrien III Jean-Baptiste de Lannoy, Baron of Clairvaux.
Félix-Balthasar de Lannoy
Florent Stanislas-Amour de Lannoy-Clairvaux;married to Clementine-Josephine of Loos-Corswarem, Princess of Rheina-Wolbecq.
Napoleon de Lannoy-Clairvaux, Prince of Rheina-Wolbecq.

Princes of Sulmona

Jean I de Lannoy
Jean II, Lord of Lannoy (1410–1493), Flemish diplomat;Married to Jeanne of Croy.
Jean III, Lord of Lannoy
Antoine de Lannoy, Lord of Maingoval;Married to Marie de Ville.
Jean IV de Lannoy, Lord of Maingoval:married to Philipotte de Lalaing.
Charles de Lannoy, 1st Prince of Sulmona (1487–1527): Knight of the Golden Fleece; soldier and statesman.
Philip de Lannoy, 2nd Prince of Sulmona: Knight of the Golden Fleece:Married to Isabelle Colonna.
Charles II de Lannoy, 3rd Prince of Sulmona, (1514-1553); died without heirs.
Horacio de Lannoy, 4th Prince of Sulmona: Knight of the Golden Fleece, died without heirs.

Current comital branch 

The current main branch of the family resides in Anvaign and descends from Jacques-Adrien-François de Lannoy (1769-1835) who was married to Louise-Marie-Caroline d'Ursel, older sister of the 4th Duke d'Ursel.

Charles-Maximilien de Lannoy (1828-1901);married to Emma, countess du Parc-Locmaria, daughter of Alain, Marquess du Parc-Locmaria.
Philippe, Count de Lannoy (1866-1937):Master of the Royal Household of Queen Elisabeth, Mayor of Anvaign.Married to  Rosalie de Beeckman (1877-1963).
Paul, Count de Lannoy (1898-1980);married to Beatrix, princesse de Ligne (1898-1982).
Philippe, count de Lannoy (1922-2019);married to Alix della Faille de Leverghem (1941-2012)
Jehan, count de Lannoy (born 1966)
Stephanie, Countess de Lannoy (born 1984),Married to Guillaume, Hereditary Grand Duke of Luxembourg.
Maurice de Lannoy (1884-1942);married to Viscountess Louise de Spoelberch (1888-1953)

See also
List of noble families in Belgium

Bibliography
Europäische Stammtafeln, J.A. Stargardt Verlag, Marburg, Schwennicke, Detlev (Ed.).  Volume VIII, Table 9

References

External links